Understanding the Criminal Mind is the debut album released by TRU. It was released in 1992 for In-a-Minute Records and was produced by Master P, E-A-Ski, CMT and K-Lou. It was later re-released in 1998 for No Limit Records.

Track listing

References

1992 debut albums
TRU (group) albums
No Limit Records albums